Rocky Knob is a name used to describe eight different mountain peaks located in the North Georgia mountains that are scattered among four different Georgia counties.

Fannin County

Rabun County

The peak falls on the Eastern Continental Divide

A  peak called Rocky Knob is located northwest of Dillard, adjacent to Hog Mountain, elevation .

Towns County
A peak called Rocky Knob is located along the boundary between Towns and Rabun counties in the Southern Nantahala Wilderness of the Chattahoochee National Forest.  The  summit is actually in Towns County and the Appalachian Trail crosses the peak.  Rocky Knob is the last named peak in Georgia crossed by the Appalachian Trail.

A  peak called Rocky Knob is located less than one mile (1.6 km) south of the North Carolina state line on Spring Ridge.

Union County
It is found on Rocky Mountain, elevation , directly south of the mountain's peak, on a spur or ridge that is oriented north-south. Rocky Knob is within the boundaries of the Brasstown Wilderness.

Locust Log Ridge has two spurs emanating from the cliffs at Blue Bluff and Rocky Knob is on the southern spur. The Arkaquah Trail, which descends from Brasstown Bald to Track Rock, passes to the north of Rocky Knob and follows the northern spur of Locust Log Ridge.

References 

Mountains of Georgia (U.S. state)
Mountains of Fannin County, Georgia
Mountains of Rabun County, Georgia
Mountains of Union County, Georgia
Mountains of Towns County, Georgia